Charles Nuttall (born James Charles Nuttall; 6 September 1872 – 28 November 1934) was an Australian artist noted for his illustrations.

Nuttall, son of James Charles Nuttall, was born at Fitzroy, Victoria. He received his art training at the National Gallery of Victoria, Melbourne, under Frederick McCubbin and contributed drawings to the Bulletin, Life, and other journals. In 1902 he completed a large monochrome painting, "Opening the First Commonwealth Parliament". The painting is in the Parliament House Art Collection in Canberra. A series of portrait sketches of well-known Australians from studies made for this picture was published in 1902, under the title, Representative Australians. In the same year a small popular book of humorous sketches, Peter Wayback visits the Melbourne Cup, was also published.

In 1905 Nuttall moved to the United States, joined the staff of the New York Herald, and contributed to Life, The Century, Harper's, and other periodicals, as well as producing book illustrations. Nuttall, who was colour blind, specialised in black and white, guache and  monochrome work. After a tour in Europe he returned to Australia in 1910, and frequently exhibited drawings and etchings at art exhibitions. He also wrote stories and articles, and was establishing a reputation as a broadcaster when he died at South Yarra, Melbourne, Victoria, on 28 November 1934. His wife, Leila Nuttall, survived him; they had no children.

Exhibitions 
1931, 3 November - 17 December: Group show with John Shirlow, Esther Paterson and Allan Jordan. Fine Art Galleries, Melbourne
 1934, to 29 September: Newman Gallery; group show with sixteen other exhibitors, including John Shirlow, Victor Cobb, Oscar Binder, J. C. Goodhart, Sydney Ure Smith, Jessie C. Traill, Harold Herbert, John C. Goodchild, Cyril Dillon and Allan Jordan.

References

External links
 
 

1872 births
1934 deaths
Australian illustrators
Australian painters
People from Fitzroy, Victoria
Artists from Melbourne
National Gallery of Victoria Art School alumni